The 2018 Idaho gubernatorial election took place on November 6 to elect the next governor of Idaho. Incumbent Republican Governor Butch Otter chose not to run for a fourth term, and the state's primaries were held on May 15.

Former state representative Paulette Jordan was the Democratic Party's nominee. She was the first Democratic nominee from Northern Idaho since Cecil Andrus, who was first elected governor in 1970.

Jordan lost to incumbent lieutenant governor Brad Little by 21.6 percentage points, for a seventh consecutive Republican victory.

A record 605,131 votes were cast for governor in 2018, a 37.6% increase over the previous election in 2014   was 452,535 votes in 2010.

Republican primary

Candidates

Declared
 Tommy Ahlquist, businessman and former emergency physician
 Harley Brown, perennial candidate
 Dalton Cannady
 Raúl Labrador, U.S. Representative
 Brad Little, Lieutenant Governor of Idaho
 Lisa Marie, perennial candidate
 Steve Pankey, Constitution nominee for governor in 2014 and future convicted murderer

Withdrew
 Troy Minton, activist (running as a Democrat)
 Russ Fulcher, former state senator and candidate for governor in 2014 (running for ID-01)

Declined
 Butch Otter, incumbent governor
 Lori Otter, First Lady of Idaho
 Lawrence Wasden, Idaho Attorney General (running for reelection)

Endorsements

Polling

*–Denotes candidates who did not enter the race.

Results

Democratic primary

Candidates

Declared
 A.J. Balukoff, businessman, member of the Boise School District board of trustees and nominee for governor in 2014
 Paulette Jordan, former state representative 
 Peter Dill, organic farmer and business attorney

Declined
 Michelle Stennett, Minority Leader of the Idaho Senate

Endorsements

Results

Independents

Candidates

Declared
Adam Phillips
Michael Richardson
John Thomas Wiechec

General election

Predictions

Debates

Polling

Results

See also 

 Idaho lieutenant gubernatorial primary election, 2018
 Elections in Idaho

References

External links
 Candidates at Vote Smart 
 Candidates at Ballotpedia

Debates
 GOP Debate

Official campaign websites
 Paulette Jordan (D) for Governor
 Brad Little (R) for Governor

2018
2018 United States gubernatorial elections
Gubernatorial